Enercities  is an educational computer-game created by the Dutch game developer Paladin Studios. The project has a €1.4M budget, and is funded by the European Commission. The game runs on Facebook and on the game website.

Game description
In this game, the player is faced with the challenge of developing an eco-friendly city. Players place buildings on a grid to grow their city. They need to balance energy sources, cash flow, and the city's Economy, Wellbeing and Environment.

References

2011 video games
Browser games
Facebook games
City-building games
Environmental education video games
Video games developed in the Netherlands